Yuri Lvovich Slezkine (Russian: Ю́рий Льво́вич Слёзкин Yúriy L'vóvich Slyózkin; born February 7, 1956) is a Russian-born American historian and translator. He is a professor of Russian history, Sovietologist, and Director of the Institute of Slavic, East European, and Eurasian Studies at the University of California, Berkeley. He is best known as the author of the  books The Jewish Century (2004) and The House of Government: A Saga of The Russian Revolution (2017).

Career
Slezkine originally trained as an interpreter in Moscow State University. His first trip outside the Soviet Union was in the late 1970s, when he worked as a translator in Mozambique. He returned to Moscow to serve as a translator of Portuguese, and spent 1982 in Lisbon before emigrating to Austin, Texas, the next year. He earned a PhD from the University of Texas, Austin.

Slezkine is a W. Glenn Campbell and Rita Ricardo-Campbell National Fellow at Stanford University's Hoover Institution and Jane K. Sather Professor of History at the University of California, Berkeley. He is also a member of the American Academy of Arts and Sciences (2008).

Slezkine's theory of ethnic identity

Slezkine characterizes the Jews  (alongside other groups  such as the Armenians and Overseas Chinese) as a Mercurian people  "specializ[ing] exclusively in providing services to the surrounding food-producing societies," which he characterizes as "Apollonians". This division is, according to him, recurring in pre-20th century societies. With the exception of the Romani, these "Mercurian peoples" have all enjoyed great socioeconomic success relative to the average among their hosts, and have all, without exception, attracted hostility and resentment. A recurring pattern of the relationship between Apollonians and Mercurian people is that the social representation of each group by the other is symmetrical, for instance Mercurians see Apollonians  as brutes while Apollonians  see Mercurians as effeminate. Mercurians develop a culture of "purity" and "national myths" to cultivate their separation from the Apollonians, which allows them to provide international services (intermediaries, diplomacy) or services that are taboo for the local Apollonian culture (linked to death, magic, sexuality or banking). Slezkine develops this thesis by arguing that the Jews, the most successful of these Mercurian peoples, have increasingly influenced the course and nature of Western societies, particularly during the early and middle periods of Soviet Communism, and that modernity can be seen as a transformation of Apollonians into Mercurians.

Works
The House of Government: A Saga of the Russian Revolution, Princeton University Press, 2017
The Jewish Century, Princeton University Press, 2004
In the Shadow of the Revolution: Life Stories of Russian Women from 1917 to the Second World War, edited by Sheila Fitzpatrick and Yuri Slezkine, Princeton University Press, 2000
Arctic Mirrors: Russia and the Small Peoples of the North, Cornell University Press, 1994
The USSR as a Communal Apartment, or How a Socialist State Promoted Ethnic Particularism, Slavic Review, Vol. 53, No. 2 (Summer 1994), 414-452
Between Heaven and Hell:  The Myth of Siberia in Russian Culture, 1993

Awards 

 2002: National Jewish Book Award in the Eastern European Studies for The Jewish Century

See also
 Amy Chua, American writer on Market dominant minorities
 The Culture of Critique series 
 Model minority
Dominant minority

References

External links
Slezkine's website at Berkeley
The Jewish Century, Chapter One: MERCURY'S SANDALS: THE JEWS AND OTHER NOMADS
An interview with Yuri Slezkine discussing the theses of his book The Jewish Century
The Chosen People: The Nation's review of The Jewish Century by Daniel Lazare, November 30, 2005
 Yuri Slezkine: «I tend to do my own things and expect you to do yours» (an interview, April 4, 2013)

1956 births
20th-century American historians
20th-century American translators
21st-century American Jews
21st-century American historians
21st-century American translators
American male non-fiction writers
American people of Russian-Jewish descent
Fellows of the American Academy of Arts and Sciences
Historians from California
Historians of Russia
Jewish American historians
Living people
Moscow State University alumni
Soviet emigrants to the United States
Soviet Jews
University of California, Berkeley faculty
University of Texas at Austin alumni
Writers about Russia